Guamote is a location in the Chimborazo Province, Ecuador. It is the seat of the Guamote Canton.

References 
 www.inec.gov.ec
 www.ame.gov.ec

External links 
 Map of the Chimborazo Province
 Travel guide to Guamote
 Guamote Canton (Spanish)

Populated places in Chimborazo Province